"Tränen trocknen schnell" is a song recorded in 1986 by Austrian singer Rainhard Fendrich.

The single peaked at No. 15 in the Austrian charts on 1 April 1987. It was in the charts for eight weeks in total.

References

1986 singles
Austrian songs
1986 songs